Lucas van Lierop (born 1988) is a Dutch-Canadian tenor based in Amsterdam.

Career 
Van Lierop was born in Hilversum, in 1988, and grew up in Vancouver, British Columbia. He began his professional vocal studies at the Schulich School of Music, under the instruction of baritone Sanford Sylvan. In 2012 he was invited to perform at the National Centre for the Performing Arts (China), with the newly establish iSing! young artist program. In 2013 van Lierop performed with the Vancouver Opera on a tour of British Columbia's schools with an adaptation of The Barber of Seville, that takes place in Barkerville. Van Lierop continued his professional operatic studies in 2015, at the Yale School of Music, studying with Richard Cross (bass-baritone). In 2018 he made his European operatic debut in a double-bill of Leonard Bernstein's Trouble in Tahiti and James MacMillan's Clemency at the Dutch National Opera's Opera Forward Festival. The success of these productions resulted in his being offered a position in the newly created opera studio at the Dutch National Opera.

In 2017, he was a prize winner at the International Jeunes Ambassadeurs Lyriques competition, and at the Montreal Symphony Orchestra competition in Montreal, resulting in an invitation to perform at Helikon Opera in Moscow. During his tenure in the Dutch National Opera Studio, he covered the role of Joe Cannon in the European premiere of John Adams (composer)s Girls of the Golden West (opera), singing the final two performances. In December 2022, he created the role of Orphée in Orphee l'Amour Eurydice, in which he also played electric guitar. A review praised his performance as being "astounding. The depth of emotion portrayed, coupled with the sheer technicality required to master such a performance, was nothing short of amazing".

In addition to his operatic work, van Lierop has worked as a recitalist and a concert soloist, notably appearing with Helmuth Rilling at the Internationale Bachakademie Stuttgart, with Toshiyuki Shimada performing Carmina Burana (Orff) with the Yale Symphony Orchestra, and with Kent Nagano at the Concertgebouw, performing The Prince in The Snow Queen (Abrahamsen).

Non-Operatic Performances 
In 2021 van Lierop appeared on the premiere episode of Matthijs van Nieuwkerks television program Matthijs gaat door, where he performed a medley of David Bowie songs, alongside  and the  band. In December 2022 he performed the duet The Prayer (Celine Dion and Andrea Bocelli song) with Stefania (singer) in Symphonic Christmas: Fource & Friends, which was broadcast nationally on NPO Zapp.

References

External links 
 
 

1988 births
Living people
McGill University School of Music alumni
Yale School of Music alumni
Dutch tenors
People from Hilversum
21st-century Canadian male opera singers
21st-century Dutch male opera singers